Halvrimmen is a village in North Jutland, Denmark. It is located in Jammerbugt Municipality.

History
A train station was located in Halvrimmen from 1897 to 1969. The station was built by Paul Severin Arved Paulsen, and it was a stop on the Fjerritslev-Nørresundby railroad.

References

Cities and towns in the North Jutland Region
Jammerbugt Municipality
Villages in Denmark